This article provides details of international football games played by the Vietnam national football team from 2020 to present.

Results

2020

2021

2022

2023

Head-to-head records

References

2020
2020s in Vietnamese sport